Peter O'Sullivan (born 4 March 1951) is a Welsh former footballer who played at both professional and international levels as a winger, making over 500 career appearances.

Career
Born in Colwyn Bay, O'Sullivan played in England, the United States and Hong Kong for Manchester United, Brighton & Hove Albion, the San Diego Sockers, Fulham, Charlton Athletic, Reading, Seiko SA, Aldershot, Crawley Town and Maidstone United.

O'Sullivan earned three caps for the Welsh national team between 1973 and 1978.

After football
As of May 2008, O'Sullivan was working for a Brighton plant-hire company.

References

1951 births
Living people
People from Colwyn Bay
Sportspeople from Conwy County Borough
Welsh footballers
Wales international footballers
Wales under-23 international footballers
Manchester United F.C. players
Brighton & Hove Albion F.C. players
San Diego Sockers (NASL) players
Fulham F.C. players
Charlton Athletic F.C. players
Reading F.C. players
Aldershot F.C. players
Maidstone United F.C. (1897) players
Crawley Town F.C. players
English Football League players
North American Soccer League (1968–1984) players
Association football wingers
Expatriate footballers in Hong Kong
Welsh expatriate sportspeople in the United States
Expatriate soccer players in the United States
Welsh expatriate footballers